Schizolaena hystrix is a tree in the family Sarcolaenaceae. It is endemic to Madagascar. The specific epithet  is from the Latin meaning "spiny", referring to the porcupine-like appearance of the involucre.

Description
Its leaves are coriaceous. The spiny involucre is fleshy and is thought to attract lemurs, bats and birds who in turn disperse the tree's seeds.

Distribution and habitat
Schizolaena hystrix is known only from the northeastern regions of Sava, Alaotra-Mangoro, Analanjirofo and Atsinanana. Its habitat is humid evergreen forests from sea-level to  altitude.

Threats
Schizolaena hystrix is threatened by deforestation and by threats to the lemur. Deforestation due to shifting agriculture is occurring outside protected areas. However, 9 of 14 subpopulations of the tree are within protected areas. Threats to lemurs would in turn affect the tree's reproduction due to their role in seed dispersal.

References

hystrix
Endemic flora of Madagascar
Trees of Madagascar
Plants described in 1963
Taxa named by René Paul Raymond Capuron